Bentaleb is a surname. Notable people with the surname include:

Hadia Bentaleb (born 1980), Algerian fencer
Lakhdar Bentaleb (born 1988), Algerian footballer
Nabil Bentaleb (born 1994), Algerian footballer